Fraternity Life is a reality television show that aired on MTV from February 26, 2003 to November 19, 2003. The show consisted of college boys pledging to become part of a fraternity.  The show was a spin-off of Sorority Life.

First season
The first season occurred at the University at Buffalo.  It followed college students pledging for the Sigma Chi Omega fraternity.  The fraternity ended up getting in trouble for illegal hazing and breaking into the Buffalo Zoo. The fraternity has subsequently regained "on campus" status and is currently in "normal" standing with the university.

Second season
The second season occurred  at the University of California, Santa Cruz.   It followed college students pledging the Delta Omega Chi fraternity.   Once again, the show got in trouble with the university.  Two frat brothers stole a koi named Midas from a pond on campus and barbecued it and ate it.  This led to protests and eventually the revoking of the fraternity's charter by the university.

The second season was also notable for featuring the first openly gay person, Keldon Clegg, to appear on either the Fraternity Life or Sorority Life series.

References

MTV reality television series
2003 American television series debuts
2003 American television series endings
2000s American college television series
2000s American reality television series
American television spin-offs
Reality television spin-offs